Mohammed Thamer (born 1 July 1938) is a former Iraqi football goalkeeper who played for Iraq between 1957 and 1966. He was called up for the 1964 Arab Nations Cup and 1966 Arab Nations Cup.

References

Iraqi footballers
Iraq international footballers
Living people
Association football goalkeepers
1938 births